Chiu Heng-an (born 19 December 1966) is a Taiwanese judoka. He competed in the men's middleweight event at the 1988 Summer Olympics.

References

1966 births
Living people
Taiwanese male judoka
Olympic judoka of Taiwan
Judoka at the 1988 Summer Olympics
Place of birth missing (living people)